The Rose Hotel is a historic site owned by the U.S. state of Illinois.  It is located in Elizabethtown, Illinois, on the banks of the Ohio River.  The oldest wing of the hotel was built in 1812 by James McFarland.  It is one of the oldest structures in Illinois.

The earliest portion of the Rose Hotel was built in 1812, and an east addition was constructed in 1848.  In the years following the Civil War, a rear dining room and a covered, two-story porch and stairway were added. In 1882, a pavilion called the "summer house" was built on the edge of the bluff in front of the hotel.

In 1891, Sarah Rose Baker, a widow who had worked at the hotel for seven years, purchased the hotel from the McFarlan family. The hotel passed to daughter Charlotte Rose Gullet upon Sarah Rose's death in 1939 and remained in the Gullet family until the state of Illinois purchased the property in 1988.  A large restoration project was complete in 2000, and the hotel opened again for business.

The hotel is currently leased by the Illinois Historic Preservation Agency to a private-sector operator, Sandy Vineyard, who maintains the structure as a bed and breakfast.  The exterior is restored to its 1889 appearance.

References

External links
Rose Hotel

Hotel buildings on the National Register of Historic Places in Illinois
Hotel buildings completed in 1812
Buildings and structures in Hardin County, Illinois
Illinois State Historic Sites
1813 establishments in the United States
Georgian architecture in Illinois
Bed and breakfasts in Illinois
National Register of Historic Places in Hardin County, Illinois